Gakaba Airstrip  is an airstrip near Gakaba, a hamlet on the Maroni River in Suriname. The runway is just west of the hamlet.

Charters and destinations 
Charter Airlines serving this airport are:

See also

 List of airports in Suriname
 Transport in Suriname

References

External links
YouTube - Landing at Gakaba Dec 2010
OpenStreetMap - Gakaba Aistrip

Airports in Suriname
Sipaliwini District